Susan Rubin Suleiman is a Hungarian-born American literary scholar. She is the C. Douglas Dillon Professor of the Civilization of France and Professor of Comparative Literature at Harvard University.

Biography 
Suleiman was born in Budapest and emigrated to the United States as a child. She received her B.A. from Barnard College and a PhD from Harvard University. She taught at Columbia University, Occidental College, before joining the faculty of Harvard University in 1981, when she has been a professor ever since. She has served as the chair of Harvard's Department of Literature and Comparative Literature. Her scholarship has focused on the contemporary literature and culture of France, including the life and works of novelist Irène Némirovsky.

Suleiman received a Guggenheim Fellowship in 1987. She was named an officer of the Ordre des Palmes académiques in 1992 by the French government. In 2019, she was awarded a Legion of Honour.

References 

Living people

Year of birth missing (living people)
Harvard University faculty

Barnard College alumni
Harvard University alumni
Columbia University faculty
Occidental College faculty
Recipients of the Legion of Honour
Hungarian Jews
American people of Hungarian-Jewish descent
People from Budapest